Hermogenes aliferella is a moth in the family Xyloryctidae, and the only species in the genus Hermogenes. It was described by Zeller in 1867 and is found in India.

References

Xyloryctidae
Moths described in 1867